Stackhouse is a surname. Notable people and characters with the name include:

People
 Charles Stackhouse (born 1980), American football player
 Eleanor Stackhouse Atkinson (1863–1942), American author, journalist and teacher
 Eli T. Stackhouse (1824–1892), U.S. Representative from South Carolina
 Emily Stackhouse (1811–1870), Cornish botanical illustrator
 Houston Stackhouse (1910–1980) American Delta blues guitarist and singer
 Jerry Stackhouse (born 1974), American professional basketball player
 John Stackhouse (disambiguation), multiple people, including:
John G. Stackhouse, Jr. (born 1960), Canadian scholar and writer
John Stackhouse (botanist) (1742–1819), English botanist
John Stackhouse (colonial administrator), administrator of the English East India Company
John Stackhouse (Globe and Mail) (born 1962), Canadian journalist and author
 Max Lynn Stackhouse (1935–2016), professor at Princeton Theological Seminary
 Reginald Stackhouse (born 1925), Canadian educator and former politician
 Robert Stackhouse (born 1942), American artist and sculptor
 Ron Stackhouse (born 1949), Canadian ice hockey defenseman
 Ted Stackhouse (1894–1975), Canadian ice hockey defenceman
 Thomas Stackhouse (1677–1752), English theologian and controversialist
 Thomas Stackhouse (antiquary) (1756–1836), English educational writer and antiquary, grandson of the theologian Thomas Stackhouse

Fictional characters
 Adele Stackhouse, character in The Southern Vampire Mysteries and True Blood
 Jason Stackhouse, character in The Southern Vampire Mysteries and True Blood
 Lt. Jeremy Stackhouse, a character in the 2001 film Behind Enemy Lines
 Sookie Stackhouse, the main character in The Southern Vampire Mysteries and True Blood

See also
 Stackhouse, North Yorkshire, England
 Stackhouse Park, Westmont, Pennsylvania

English-language surnames
Surnames of English origin